The St Kilda saltfields brine spill is an ongoing environmental disaster occurring in St Kilda, South Australia. Former salt production ponds are leaking brine into adjacent wetlands causing death and distress to mangroves, the salt marsh and intertidal ecological communities of Barker Inlet.

Impact 
In late 2020, brine leaking from former salt production ponds managed by the private company, Buckland Dry Creek Pty Ltd (a subsidiary of Adelaide Resource Recovery Pty Ltd) caused damage to adjacent natural vegetation. The brine was seeping from ponds which had cracked and compromised gypsum linings. It was first publicly reported that 10 hectares of mangroves had died and 35 hectares of salt marsh had been impacted. As of 2021, the problem has spread and worsened over an impact area exceeding 190 hectares. This has resulted in die-back and distress to mature forests of the Grey mangrove, Avicennia marina, and associated salt marsh habitats. The brine renders life in the shallow estuarine environment impossible for most marine organisms and the loss of vegetation has reduced habitat for many birds and insects. This is expected to reduce the availability of food for migratory shorebirds and resident species. Further harm can be reduced if brine is pumped out of the ponds, but pure sodium chloride is becoming an increasing problem as it crystallizes across the impact zone. The spill is a candidate for South Australia's worst marine environmental disaster, second only to the 1992 Port Bonython oil spill until the full extent of the impact is known.

Location 
The St Kilda salt fields lie to the north of Barker Inlet in South Australia. The impacted area includes habitats adjacent to the salt fields and is visible from the St Kilda mangrove boardwalk which is a popular tourist attraction and site for environmental education. The wider impact area includes the estuaries of the Helps Road drainage and Little Para River.

Response 
South Australia's Minister for the Environment, David Speirs has described the removal of brine from the ponds as "incredibly tricky" and claimed that the Government is working with Buckland Dry Creek to fix the problem as quickly as possible. The Department for Energy and Mining is the regulator responsible for the site, and told the ABC that Buckland Dry Creek has pumped brine against their "holding pattern" directions. The Department for Energy and Mining maintains a webpage where it provides updates on the incident and provides images, maps and background information.

Citizens and independent experts have undertaken aerial surveys and established baseline data to track and measure loss and recovery in the areas impacted. A vigil in support of the mangroves and calling for affirmative action from the Government was held on the steps of the South Australian parliament on World Wetlands Day, 2 February 2021. Speakers included parliamentarians from the Labor and Greens parties, including Susan Close, Peter Malinauskas, Mark Parnell and Tammy Franks who were variously critical of the government response.

References

External links 

 Bushcast, YouTube channel by botanist and environmental consultant Peri Coleman tracking the spill

Environmental disasters in Australia
Mangroves